Uyu K'uchu (Aymara uyu corral, k'uchu, q'uch'u corner, "corral corner", also spelled Uyu Khuchu) is a mountain in the Cordillera Real in the Andes of Bolivia, about  high. It is situated in the La Paz Department, Murillo Province, La Paz Municipality. Uyu K'uchu lies south of the mountain Sankayuni and north-east of the mountain Kunturiri.

References 

Mountains of La Paz Department (Bolivia)